Ariadne is a 1913 painting by Italian painter Giorgio de Chirico. Done in oil and graphite on canvas, the painting depicts the mythical figure Ariadne as she lies sleeping in an empty public square; this is in reference to the myth that birthed the character, in which Ariadne is abandoned on Naxos by her lover Theseus. According to sources provided by the Metropolitan Museum of Art, this reflects Chirico's personal feelings of isolation after moving to Paris in 1911.

The painting was donated to the Metropolitan Museum of Art as part of the bequest of Florene Schoenborn in 1995.

References

See also
The Soothsayer's Recompense, another painting by Chirico that depicted Ariadne

1913 paintings
Paintings by Giorgio de Chirico
Paintings in the collection of the Metropolitan Museum of Art
Paintings depicting Greek myths
Ariadne